Pavel Anděl (born 1966, Cheb, Czechoslovakia (now Czech Republic) is a Czech actor, musician, writer, dramaturge, and television presenter.

He graduated from the grammar school in Cheb. After graduating from briefly acting at DAMU at the Academy of Performing Arts in Prague, he started to act at the Příbramský theater, and after five years, he performed in the Usti Drama Studio. With moderating, he began on radio Evropa 2, about three years later, he worked in Prima Televize, where he worked on the preparation of the show S.O.S.. From 1998 to 2009, prepared jointly with the editor Jan Kratochvil of ČT2 their own show Noc s Andělem, thanks to which he gained a certain notoriety. In addition, he is also a dramaturgical out to produce and ensure programs and Orange Musicblok. He is currently working on a radio show on 105.9 RockZone with his own eponymous show, Andělská dvacítka, and features his own TV show on TV Slušnej Kanál. He was a jury member for the jury panel of the Czech Republic during the Eurovision Song Contest 2016.

External links
 Stránky Mladážena.cz
 Chat České televize
 Rozhovor s Pavlem Andělem – neplatný odkaz !
 Rozhovor s Pavlem Andělem na iDnes.cz
 Musicserver.cz
 Rozhovor s Andělem na RockZone 105,9 – neplatný odkaz !

1966 births
Living people
People from Cheb
Czech male actors
Academy of Performing Arts in Prague alumni